Juan Gabriel is the self-titled and twenty-seventh studio album by Mexican singer-songwriter Juan Gabriel. It was released on May 4, 2010, his first studio album in seven years. On this album, there are 11 tracks, 5 of which had never been previously recorded, and the remaining 6 tracks are songs that Gabriel had written, but were recorded by other artists, and Gabriel himself having recorded them himself for the first time.

Track listing

Sales and certifications

Charts

References

External links 
  official website Juan Gabriel
official website on Universal Music
  Juan Gabriel the album on itunes.apple.com
 Juan Gabriel the album on target.com

2010 albums
Juan Gabriel albums
Spanish-language albums
Fonovisa Records albums